Miller Township is a township in Huntingdon County, Pennsylvania, United States. The population was 459 at the 2020 census.

History

Following the American Revolution, Matthew Miller and his wife, Mary Dunn, emigrated from County Donegal, Ireland to Juniata County. A few years later, they moved and settled on a beautiful piece of ground in what is now Miller Township. The land they owned is situated on top of Warrior Ridge and is still owned by Matthew's descendants. It is for him that the township is named.

Established in 1881, Miller Township was one of the last municipalities created within Huntingdon County. At the time of formation, Miller Township's population was estimated to be between four and five hundred citizens. Today, the population is officially 459.

Geography
According to the United States Census Bureau, the township has a total area of 22.4 square miles (58.1 km), all  land.

Demographics

As of the census of 2000, there were 514 people, 199 households, and 153 families residing in the township.  The population density was 22.9 people per square mile (8.8/km).  There were 239 housing units at an average density of 10.7/sq mi (4.1/km).  The racial makeup of the township was 99.42% White and 0.58% African American.

There were 199 households, out of which 34.2% had children under the age of 18 living with them, 68.8% were married couples living together, 4.5% had a female householder with no husband present, and 23.1% were non-families. 19.1% of all households were made up of individuals, and 5.5% had someone living alone who was 65 years of age or older.  The average household size was 2.58 and the average family size was 2.95.

In the township the population was spread out, with 25.5% under the age of 18, 4.1% from 18 to 24, 31.1% from 25 to 44, 26.1% from 45 to 64, and 13.2% who were 65 years of age or older.  The median age was 39 years. For every 100 females, there were 98.5 males.  For every 100 females age 18 and over, there were 91.5 males.

The median income for a household in the township was $37,283, and the median income for a family was $42,000. Males had a median income of $32,292 versus $30,625 for females. The per capita income for the township was $17,680.  About 7.2% of families and 6.8% of the population were below the poverty line, including 3.1% of those under age 18 and 6.3% of those age 65 or over.

References

External links
Miller Township

Townships in Huntingdon County, Pennsylvania
Townships in Pennsylvania